Cristopher Nakampe Malematja is a South African politician who has been an African National Congress Member of the National Assembly of South Africa since February 2022. He is the current chairperson of the South African National Civic Organization (SANCO) in Gauteng.

Since becoming an MP, Malematja has been a member of the Portfolio Committee on Trade and Industry.

References

External links
Profile at Parliament of South Africa

Living people
Place of birth missing (living people)
Year of birth missing (living people)
People from Gauteng
Members of the National Assembly of South Africa
African National Congress politicians